The Well of Barhout (also nicknamed Well of Hell) is a sink hole in Al-Mahara, Yemen.

Physical features

Exploration

It was first explored by the Oman Cave Exploration Team (OCET), who reached the bottom on September 15, 2021. Footage provided to Agence France-Presse (AFP) showed cave formations such as stalagmites and grey and lime-green cave pearls, formed by dripping water. 
The speleologists also report having found snakes, dead animals, and waterfalls in the cave. 

Amateur cave explorers have entered the sinkhole before, but until now nobody was known to have made it all the way to the bottom..
 Samples of the rocks, soil, water, and dead birds found in the cave were collected for further analysis. A full report of the team's findings will be made available to the public.

Folklore
Local folklore says the cave was created as a prison for jinn, and superstition has it that objects near the hole can be sucked towards it. Some nearby residents think that it's bad luck to even talk about it.

See also 
 Geology of Yemen

References

External links
Photographs of the Well of Hell, from Gulf News

Caves of Asia